Marwin Janver Malinay Angeles (born 9 January 1991) is a professional footballer who plays as a midfielder in the Philippines national team. He is currently free of any contract. 

Born in Venice, Italy to Filipino parents, Angeles spent his youth career at Venezia. In 2011, he moved to the Philippines to play in the United Football League (UFL), having spells with Laos, Global, and Ceres. In 2017, he joined Kaya with whom he won the first edition of the Copa Paulino Alcantara, and in 2021 scored the first-ever AFC Champions League goal for a Filipino club.

Angeles represented the Philippines at the 2011 Southeast Asian Games and 2012 AFF Championship. His twin brother, Marvin, is also a footballer.

Club career 
Angeles started his youth career at Venezia, and eventually moved to the Philippines in August 2011 to play for Laos FC, currently playing in the United Football League Division 2. In March 2012, he and his twin brother moved to Global FC in the middle of the season. In March 2014 left his club Global FC and joined to Ceres F.C.

Angeles joined Kaya in 2017 for the first season of the Philippines Football League (PFL). On 26 June 2021, he became the first player from a Filipino club to score in the AFC Champions League proper—a consolation goal in their 4–1 loss to BG Pathum United.

International career 
In May 2011, he joined the national team training pool, and by September 2011 he was named in the provisional Philippines under-23 squad for the 2011 Southeast Asian Games. He made his first appearance as a substitute in the 3–2 win against Laos.

He was also part of the under-21 national team that participated in the 2012 Hassanal Bolkiah Trophy, making a debut in a 2–8 loss against Myanmar on 24 February 2012.

On 24 January 2012, he featured for the senior national team in a friendly match against Icheon Citizen FC, wherein he scored the equalizer to end the match 1–1 in regulation time, forcing a penalty shoot-out that eventually led them to a 2–4 loss. On 29 February 2012, he then made his first full international appearance as a substitute in the 1–1 draw against Malaysia. On 15 November 2012, he scored his full international goal for the Philippines resulting a 1–0 win over Singapore Lions.

International goals
Scores and results list the Philippines' goal tally first.

Personal life 
Angeles was born to Filipino parents in Venice, Italy. He has a twin brother, Marvin Angeles, who is also a professional footballer who plays for Stallion Laguna and as well a Philippines international. He is currently on leave from studying for an Electronics Engineering degree at the Istituto Livio Sanudo while on national team duty.

Honours

Club
Global
UFL Division 1: 2012;  Runner-up 2013

National team
AFC Challenge Cup: Third 2012
Philippine Peace Cup: 2013

Career statistics

Club

References 

1991 births
Living people
Footballers from Venice
Citizens of the Philippines through descent
Italian people of Filipino descent
Italian footballers
Filipino footballers
Philippines international footballers
Association football midfielders
Filipino expatriate footballers
Ceres–Negros F.C. players
Kaya F.C. players
Persik Kediri players
Filipino twins
Italian twins
Twin sportspeople
Global Makati F.C. players
Philippines Football League players
Liga 1 (Indonesia) players
Expatriate footballers in Indonesia
Filipino expatriate sportspeople in Indonesia